The Autovía SA-20 is a highway of approximately 3,5 kilometers in central Spain between Autovía A-50 and Autovía A-66.

Because it is not the doubling of the N501 it replaces, it is built as a new road, so you can not value it as an upgrade of the N501.

Departures 

Autopistas and autovías in Spain
Transport in Castile and León